Hinrich Freese was a fishing trawler built in 1930 by Deutsche Schiff- und Maschinenbau AG for the Hanseatische Hochseefisherei AG. She was requisitioned by the Kriegsmarine in 1940, serving until deliberately wrecked in November 1940 whilst being chased by the British cruiser .

Description
She was powered by a triple expansion steam engine of 92 nhp, driving a single screw propeller via a low pressure turbine. The engine was built by Deutsche Schiff- und Maschinenbau AG (Deschimag), Wesermünde.

History
Hinrich Freese was built as yard number 504 by Deschimag, Wesermünde for the Hanseatische Hochseefisherei AG, being completed in December 1930. Her port of registry was Bremerhaven. The Code Letters QVNT, and fishing registration BX 215 were allocated. With the change of Code Letters in 1934, Hinrich Freese was allocated the letter DQOZ.

In 1940, Hinrich Freese was requisitioned by the Kriegsmarine. She was converted to a weather ship and was commissioned on 1 March as WBS 4 Hinrich Freese. Her complement was nineteen, plus five meteorologists. On 20 March, she departed from Wilhelmshaven to operate north of Iceland. The first weather reports were sent on 30 March. She returned to Wilhelmshaven in mid-April.

on 24 May, Hinrich Freese sailed from Trondheim in German-occupied Norway to relieve Adolf Vinnen north of Iceland. Adolf Vinnen and Fritz Homann were also involved in this operation.

Hinrich Freese sailed from Trondheim on 19 October for Jan Mayen. On 29 October, a Heinkel He 115 seaplane crashed on landing at Jan Mayen. Her crew were rescued by Hinrich Freese. A second He 115 was wrecked in a storm that night and the mission was cancelled. Hinrich Freese returned to Trondheim with the four Luftwaffe personnel from the aircraft.

Hinrich Freese sailed from Trondheim on 12 November for Jan Mayen, arriving four days later. She was carrying a total of 24 men. HMS Naiad gave chase; realising that she could not outrun the cruiser, her captain deliberately ran her ashore at high speed on the Søraustkapp, wrecking the ship with the loss of two lives. They served the rest of the war as prisoners of war, although one of them was killed in a German air raid on Woolwich, London on 28 January 1941.

References

1930 ships
Ships built in Bremen (state)
Fishing vessels of Germany
World War II auxiliary ships of Germany
Weather ships
Maritime incidents in November 1940
World War II shipwrecks in the Norwegian Sea